Theophilus Jones (1729? – 8 December 1811) was an Irish MP and administrator.

He was born the eldest son of Walter Jones of Headfort and Olivia, the daughter and coheiress of the Hon. Chidley Coote of Coote Hall, County Roscommon.

He served three periods as MP for County Leitrim in the Parliament of Ireland, sitting from 1761 to 1768, 1776 to 1783 and 1790 to 1800. He also sat for Coleraine (1769 to 1776) and Monaghan Borough (1783 to 1790).

He was appointed secretary to Augustus Hervey, 3rd Earl of Bristol when the latter was Chief Secretary of Ireland in 1766, holding the post until 1799. He was appointed a Privy Counsellor in 1767 and Collector of Excise at the Port of Dublin from 1767 to 1799. After the Union with Great Britain in 1800 he was MP for Leitrim in the Parliament of the United Kingdom from 1801 to 1802.

Jones married three times, firstly in 1754 to the Hon. Catherine Beresford, daughter of 1st Earl of Tyrone, and widow of Thomas Christmas MP of Whitefield, County Waterford.  They had 3 sons:
 Walter Jones (1754–1839), governor of County Leitrim, and an MP for Coleraine
 Theophilus Jones, a Royal Navy admiral
 Reverend James Jones (died 1825), a Church of Ireland rector in County Down

After Catherine 's death in 1763, he remarried in 1768 to Anne Murray, daughter of Colonel John Murray MP from Monaghan, with whom he had one son and two daughters:
Henry, who died young
Maria, died unmarried
 Anne, died in infancy

He served as collector of customs at Dublin Port for a period ending in 1799 however for much of this period he farmed out the position.

References
 

Year of birth missing
1811 deaths
Members of the Privy Council of Ireland
Irish MPs 1761–1768
Irish MPs 1769–1776
Irish MPs 1776–1783
Irish MPs 1783–1790
Irish MPs 1790–1797
Irish MPs 1798–1800
UK MPs 1801–1802
Chief Secretaries for Ireland
Members of the Parliament of Ireland (pre-1801) for County Leitrim constituencies
Members of the Parliament of Ireland (pre-1801) for County Londonderry constituencies
Members of the Parliament of Ireland (pre-1801) for County Monaghan constituencies
Members of the Parliament of the United Kingdom for County Leitrim constituencies (1801–1922)